Robert Edwards Hankinson (1798-1868) was Archdeacon of Norwich from 1 July 1857 until his death.

Hankinson was educated at Trinity College, Cambridge. He held livings in Norwich, Hampstead, Kings Lynn, Halesworth and North Creake.

He died on 28 March 1868.

References

1798 births
1868 deaths
19th-century English Anglican priests
Archdeacons of Norwich
Alumni of Trinity College, Cambridge